RFA Prince Salvor (A292) was a salvage vessel of the Royal Fleet Auxiliary.

External links
http://www.uboat.net/allies/warships/ship/7708.html

1943 ships
King Salvor-class salvage vessels